Saturday Night Movies is a Canadian film television series which aired on CBC Television in 1977.

Premise
Various feature films from Canada and other nations were presented during this time, as Saturday night replacement programming between hockey seasons.

Scheduling
This normally two-hour series was broadcast on Saturdays from 8:30 p.m. from 28 May to 1 October 1977.

 28 May 1977: Goldenrod
 4 June 1977: Monty Python and the Holy Grail
 11 June 1977: The Man Inside
 18 June 1977: Love Among the Ruins
 25 June 1977: I Will Fight No More Forever
 2 July 1977: Wings in the Wilderness
 9 July 1977: Guys and Dolls
 16 July 1977: Wuthering Heights
 23 July 1977: Sudden Fury
 30 July 1977: (pre-empted for music special, The Magic Flute)
 6 August 1977: The Bishop's Wife
 13 August 1977: Between Friends
 20 August 1977: The Secret Life of Walter Mitty
 27 August 1977: Brethren
 3 September 1977: Hans Christian Andersen
 10 September 1977: Second Wind
 17 September 1977: The Apprenticeship of Duddy Kravitz
 24 September 1977: The Fighting Men (8 p.m.)
 1 October 1977: Love is a Long Shot (9 p.m.)

References

External links
 

CBC Television original programming
1977 Canadian television series debuts
1977 Canadian television series endings